Louis Saint-Gaudens  (January 1, 1854 – March 8, 1913) was a significant American sculptor of the Beaux-Arts generation.  He was the brother of renowned sculptor Augustus Saint-Gaudens; Louis later changed the spelling of his name to St. Gaudens to differentiate himself from his well-known brother.

Life and career
Born in New York City to a French-born father, Bernard Paul Ernest Saint-Gaudens, and an Irish-born mother, Mary McGuiness, Louis received his early training as a cameo cutter from his brother, who later assisted him in beginning his art studies in Rome. In 1878 he and his brother Augustus moved to Paris where they shared a studio and attended the École des Beaux-Arts.  Louis studied at the École from 1879 to 1880.

Returning to America, he settled in Flint, Ohio, where he lived from 1898 to 1900.  There he met his future wife, sculptor Annetta Johnson.  Their son, Paul Saint-Gaudens, was a master potter who became known for his Orchard Kiln Pottery Works.  In 1900 the family relocated to Cornish, New Hampshire, a mile away from Louis's brother's studio.

For the rest of his life, Louis Saint-Gaudens not only worked as his brother's assistant but also pursued commissions of his own. He sculpted major pieces for the Boston Public Library; the Church of the Ascension, New York; The Brearley School, New York; Union Station, Washington, D.C.; U.S. Customs House, New York; St. Louis Art Museum; Metropolitan Museum of Art, New York; New York Life Insurance Company Building, New York; the Joseph Francis U.S. Congressional Medal; and the Benjamin Franklin Centennial Medal of 1906.

The over fifty sculptures that Saint-Gaudens completed for Washington, D.C.'s Union Station are considered his masterwork.  He was a member of the National Sculpture Society.

Legacy
Louis Saint-Gaudens died of pneumonia, aged 59, in Cornish, New Hampshire.  His home and studio in Cornish, New Hampshire, a former Shaker Meetinghouse, is on the National Register of Historic Places.

Significant Works
 

 1890 Eagle and nest of eaglets - New York Life Insurance Building, Kansas City, MO
 1891 Young St. John the Baptist - Font of Church of the Ascension (New York)
 1894 Lions - Boston Public Library, Boston, MA
 1896 Statue of Homer - Main Reading Room, Library of Congress - Washington, DC
 1902 Eagles and seal of the State of New York - Roswell P. Flower Monument, Watertown, NY (with Augustus Saint-Gaudens)
 1905 Holland Statue, Exterior of Alexander Hamilton U.S. Custom House, New York, NY
 1905 Portugal Statue, Exterior of Alexander Hamilton U.S. Custom House, New York, NY
 1908 Joseph Francis Medal, United States Mint
 1912 The Progress of Railroading, Union Station (Washington, D.C.)
 1914 Forty-six Roman Legionnaire Statues - Interior of Union Station (Washington, D.C.)

References

Notes

Sources
 "Art In American Churches", New York Times, January 20, 1895
 "Art Notes", New York Times, December 21, 1884
 "Louis St. Gaudens Dead", New York Times, March 13, 1913
 "Uncle Sam's Medal Factory", Washington Post, June 13, 1909
 Armstrong, Craven, et al., 200 Years of American Sculpture, Whitney Museum of Art, NYC, 1976
 Craven, Wayne, Sculpture in America, Thomas Y. Crowell Co, NY, NY  1968
 Goode, James M., The Outdoor Sculpture of Washington, DC, Smithsonian Press, Washington, DC, 1974
 Johnson, Louis, Early History of the Home & Studios of Louis and Annette St. Gaudens Published by John H. Dryfhout, Cornish, NH
 Saint-Gaudens, Augustus, The Reminiscences of Augustus Saint-Gaudens, Edited and Amplified by Homer Saint-Gaudens, Published By The Century Co. New York, MCMXIII
 Taft, Lorado, The History of American Sculpture, MacMillan Co., New York, NY  1925
 Wilkinson, Burke, and David Finn, photographs, Uncommon Clay: The Life and Works of Augustus Saint-Gaudens, Harcourt Brace Jovanovich, Publishers, San Diego  1985The Greater Journey: Americans in Paris'' by David McCullough, Simon & Schuster, New York, NY, May 2011

External links
Louis Saint-Gaudens Home, New Hampshire

Augustus Saint-Gaudens, Master Sculptor, exhibition catalog fully online as PDF from The Metropolitan Museum of Art, which contains material on Louis Saint-Gaudens
"Columbus taking possession of the New World" sculpture by Louis Saint-Gaudens and Mary Lawrence Tonetti at the east portal of the Administration Building - World's Columbian Exposition 1893 in Chicago, Ill.
Benjamin Franklin Bicentennial Medal in Museum of Fine Arts in Boston

1854 births
1913 deaths
Artists from New York City
American people of French descent
American people of Irish descent
American architectural sculptors
Deaths from pneumonia in New Hampshire
American alumni of the École des Beaux-Arts
Artists from New Hampshire
19th-century American sculptors
19th-century American male artists
American male sculptors
20th-century American sculptors
20th-century American male artists
Sculptors from New York (state)
Artists of the Boston Public Library